The Financial Review Rich List 2018 is the 35th annual survey of the wealthiest people resident in Australia, published by The Australian Financial Review on 25 May 2018.

The net worth of the wealthiest individual, Anthony Pratt, was 12.90 billion; while the net worth of the 200th wealthiest individual, Radek Sali, was 387 million; up from $341 million in 2017. The combined wealth of the 200 individuals was calculated as 282.7 billion; compared with a combined wealth of 6.4 billion in 1984 when the BRW Rich 200 commenced. Nineteen women were included on the 2018 Rich List, representing 8.5 percent of the list. The average age was 66 years. The list included a record 76 individuals whose net worth was one billion or more, an increase of 16 from 2017; and about one-quarter of those billionaires lived offshore at the time of the list's publication.

List of individuals 

{| class="wikitable"
!colspan="2"|Legend
|-
! Icon
! Description
|-
|
|Has not changed from the previous year's list
|-
|
|Has increased from the previous year's list
|-
|
|Has decreased from the previous year's list
|}

See also
 Financial Review Rich List
 Forbes Asia list of Australians by net worth

References

External links 

2018 in Australia
2018